Stanford Stadium is an outdoor college football stadium on the west coast of the United States, located on the campus of Stanford University in Stanford, California. It is the home of the Stanford Cardinal and hosts the university's commencement exercises. Opened  in 1921 as a football and track and field stadium, it was an earthen horseshoe with wooden bleacher seating and flooring upon a steel frame. Its original seating capacity was 60,000, which grew to 89,000 by 1927 as a nearly enclosed bowl.

Immediately following the 2005 season, the stadium was demolished and rebuilt as a dual-deck concrete structure, without a track. Today, it seats 50,424.

Early history

Stanford Stadium was built in five months in 1921 and opened its gates on November 19, replacing Stanford Field. The first game was against rival California, who defeated Stanford 42–7 in the Big Game. Seating capacity was originally 60,000, with a 66-row, U-Shaped structure second only to the Yale Bowl in size at the time.

In 1925, 10,200 seats were added to the stadium, nearly enclosing the horseshoe while still keeping the overall height of the facility intact. In 1927, fourteen additional rows of seating were added, increasing the stadium to its maximum capacity of 85,500, with eighty rows of seating.  In 1932, the stadium hosted the USA Outdoor Track and Field Championships. In 1935, Stanford Stadium set a record (for the time) for single-game attendance, with 94,000 spectators filling it for a 13–0 victory over California.

NFL
In January 1985, Super Bowl XIX was held in Stanford Stadium, with the Bay Area's own San Francisco 49ers defeating the Miami Dolphins, 38–16.

As of 2021, Stanford Stadium is one of two venues (the Rose Bowl being the other) to host a Super Bowl without previously serving as the home stadium of a National Football League (NFL) or American Football League (AFL) team, and Super Bowl XIX is one of only three Super Bowls where the host region saw its team win (the others being Super Bowl LV and Super Bowl LVI, where the Tampa Bay Buccaneers and the Los Angeles Rams respectively became the first two teams to play and win a Super Bowl at their home stadiums).

On October 22, 1989, the San Francisco 49ers played a home game at the stadium against the New England Patriots, as Candlestick Park had suffered serious damage following the Loma Prieta earthquake five days earlier.

Soccer
The stadium has hosted soccer matches for the 1984 Summer Olympics as one of three venues outside southern California for that Olympics, the 1994 FIFA World Cup, and the 1999 FIFA Women's World Cup.

Major League Soccer's San Jose Earthquakes have hosted one match at the stadium each year since 2011. The first year's opponent was the New York Red Bulls; since 2012, the Earthquakes have used the stadium to host their home leg of the California Clásico versus the Los Angeles Galaxy.

 1994 FIFA World Cup matches

 1999 FIFA Women's World Cup match

Other international soccer matches

Other notable events
Other high-profile events hosted at Stanford Stadium include Herbert Hoover's acceptance speech for the 1928 Republican Presidential nomination and the 1962 edition of the long-running (1958–1985) series of track meets between the United States and the Soviet Union.

Modern renovations

The stadium has gone a number of significant renovations since the 1920s. In 1960, a press box was added, while the first, and last synthetic athletics track was installed in 1978 (replacing the cinder track that had been used for many years).

In 1985, prior to Super Bowl XIX, the press box was renovated, new locker rooms were installed, a ticket complex and dressing room for game officials were added, and the number of restrooms were increased.

In 1994, prior to the 1994 FIFA World Cup, the lower level of the press box was expanded and aluminum benches were installed throughout the stadium. The crown of the playing surface was also reduced.

In 1995, a $10 million gift from Los Angeles insurance executive and 1935 Stanford graduate Louis W. Foster enabled further updates to the stadium, including widening the concourse, improving the restrooms, and replacing the remaining wooden seats. In honor of his gift, Stanford named the playing surface the Louis W. Foster Family Field at Stanford Stadium.

2005–2006 demolition and reconstruction

In June 2005, the university Board of Trustees authorized plans for the stadium's demolition and reconstruction that would remove the track, reduce the stadium capacity, and bring it up to date with present standards for sporting venues. Various justifications for the renovation included poor sightlines in the existing stadium (rendering the bottom 14 rows unusable), long stairways, and lack of adequate restroom facilities. The track around the stadium had previously created a large distance between the field and the spectators.

The capacity of the new stadium was set to be approximately 50,000 seats, which were made by Ducharme Seating. The reduction in capacity was a strategic decision by Stanford's Athletics Program to boost season ticket sales and create a more intimate playing atmosphere without sacrificing the ability to host large world-class events, such as the FIFA World Cup, in the future. This was partially the result of San Francisco's failure to secure a bid for the 2012 Olympics, which would have featured a renovated Stanford Stadium as the main Olympic Venue.

Construction began minutes after the Cardinal's last home game of the 2005 football season, a 38–31 loss to Notre Dame on November 26. Bulldozers began tearing out the natural field turf in a ceremony held while attendees were still in the stadium for the game. Construction proceeded quickly through the winter and spring with the goal of opening in time for Stanford's game against San Jose State on September 9, 2006, but the game had to be relocated to San Jose State's Spartan Stadium due to an unusually wet winter and resulting construction delays. In the summer of 2006, a construction worker fell  to his death.

The stadium opened on September 16, 2006 with Stanford losing to Navy 37–9. The Stanford Band was not present at the stadium opening since they were not permitted to play at any athletic events in the month of September due to accusations of vandalism to a temporary trailer which formerly served as their rehearsal facility. Instead, the Navy band performed at halftime and played throughout the game.

The stadium has 43 rows on the sides, 22 rows on the ends, and 30 rows below the skybox. The skybox also has 437 spectator seats, more than double the number of the previous press box.

In 2013, Stanford upgraded their scoreboards with twin HD video boards. Also, a  ribbon board was added, which displays out-of-town scores and real-time statistics.

See also
 List of NCAA Division I FBS football stadiums

References

External links

 
 Oblique aerial photographs of Stanford Stadium

Sports venues in Santa Clara County, California
Stanford University buildings and structures
Stanford Cardinal football venues
College football venues
1994 FIFA World Cup stadiums
1999 FIFA Women's World Cup stadiums
Sports venues in the San Francisco Bay Area
Venues of the 1984 Summer Olympics
Venues of the 2028 Summer Olympics
Olympic football venues
Sports venues completed in 1921
San Francisco 49ers stadiums
1921 establishments in California
Rebuilt buildings and structures in California
Sports in Stanford, California
Athletics (track and field) venues in California
American football venues in California
Defunct athletics (track and field) venues in the United States
Soccer venues in California
Soccer in the San Francisco Bay Area